Colniza is a municipality in the state of Mato Grosso, Brazil.

Demographics

Colniza has the highest homicide rate in Brazil with 165 deaths per year per 100 thousand inhabitants.
It is the westernmost and largest (by area) municipality of the state.

Conservation

The municipality of Colniza has a mosaic of conservation units consisting of the Rio Madeirinha Ecological Station, the Rio Roosevelt Ecological Station, the Tucumã State Park and the Guariba-Roosevelt Extractive Reserve.

Satellite monitoring showed that Colniza had the highest level of deforestation in Mato Grosso in the six years from 2010 to 2016, with  cleared, most of it illegally. Rates of deforestation rose successively in 2013, 2014 and 2015.

The  Rio Madeirinha Ecological Station is a fully protected environmental unit created in 1997.
The  Rio Roosevelt Ecological Station is a strictly protected conservation unit created in 1997.
The  Guariba-Roosevelt Extractive Reserve is a sustainable use unit created in 1996.
The municipality also contains  of the Campos Amazônicos National Park, a  protected area created in 2006 that protects an unusual enclave of cerrado vegetation in the Amazon rainforest.
It contains 44% of the  Igarapés do Juruena State Park, created in 2002.

References

Sources

 

Municipalities in Mato Grosso
Populated places established in 1998